Wahida Faizi is an Afghan journalist who was head of the Women Journalist Section of the  from 2015 until  the fall of Kabul on 15 August 2021.

Life 
She was born and raised in Kabul to a family originally from Parwan Province. She graduated from Maryam Secondary School in 2013 and continued her studies in political science at the Kabul University. She became interested in journalism in eight grade. While studying journalism, she worked in television and then on Radio Amuzgar as a speaker in educational programs. Faizi was selected as the 2015 best reporter by Nai (SOMA) Supporting Open Media in Afghanistan.

After graduating, she worked in news reporting for 4 years. Faizi focused on the situation of Afghan women and in 2016, joined the Afghan Journalists Safety Committee as head of the Women Journalist Section. The difficulties she faced during her career as female journalist in Taliban controlled Afghanistan prompted her to continue her activities under the pseudonym Heila for a period of time.

On August 26, 2021, after the fall of Kabul, she fled Afghanistan for fear that the Taliban would kill her because of her work.

References 

Living people
People from Kabul
Afghan women journalists
21st-century Afghan women writers
Kabul University alumni
1993 births
Afghan refugees